Elmer, the Great is a 1933 American pre-Code comedy film directed by Mervyn LeRoy, starring Joe E. Brown and Patricia Ellis.

Plot
Elmer Kane (Joe E. Brown) is a rookie ballplayer with the Chicago Cubs whose ego is matched only by his appetite. Because he is not only vain but naive, Elmer's teammates take great delight in pulling practical jokes on him. Still, he is so valuable a player that the Cubs management hides the letters from his hometown sweetheart Nellie (Patricia Ellis), so that Elmer won't bolt the team and head for home. When Nellie comes to visit Elmer, she finds him in an innocent but compromising situation with a glamorous actress (Claire Dodd). She turns her back on him, and disconsolate Elmer tries to forget his troubles at a crooked gambling house. Elmer incurs an enormous gambling debt, which the casino's owner is willing to forget if Elmer will only throw the deciding World Series game (which he refers to as the World Serious).

Elmer brawls with the gambler and lands in jail, where he learns of a particularly cruel practical joke that had previously been played on him. Out of spite, he refuses to play in the Big Game, and thanks to a jailhouse visit by the gamblers, it looks as though Elmer has taken a bribe, but when he shows up to play (after patching things up with Nellie), Elmer proves that he's been true-blue all along. Based on the 1928 Broadway play by Ring Lardner and George M. Cohan, Elmer, the Great betrays its stage origins in its static early scenes, before building to a climax during a rain-soaked ball game.

Cast
 Joe E. Brown as Elmer Kane 
 Patricia Ellis as Nellie Poole 
 Frank McHugh as Healy High-Hips 
 Claire Dodd as Evelyn Corey 
 Preston Foster as Dave Walker (as Preston S. Foster) 
 Russell Hopton as Whitey 
 Sterling Holloway as Nick Kane (as Sterling Halloway) 
 Emma Dunn as Mrs. Kane 
 Charles C. Wilson as Mr. Wade (as Charles Wilson) 
 Charles Delaney as Johnny Abbott 
 Berton Churchill as Colonel Moffitt 
 J. Carrol Naish as Jerry (as J. Carroll Naish) 
 Gene Morgan as Noonan
 George Chandler as Cubs Player

References

External links
 
 
 

1933 films
1930s sports comedy films
American baseball films
American sports comedy films
American black-and-white films
Chicago Cubs
1930s English-language films
American films based on plays
Films directed by Mervyn LeRoy
First National Pictures films
1933 comedy films
1930s American films